Polpol Kala is a village of Palamau district, situated 16 km from the nearest district town, Medininagar. National Highway 39 crosses this village. Betla National Park is in its vicinity. Neighbouring villages are Barewa, Sarja, Pokhraha, Lahlahe, Sinduriya, Jhabar, and Nawadih. It has a bank, government and private schools, hospitals and a weekly market. The local language is Hindi.

Education 
Literacy rate of this village is approximately 40%. Significant schools and colleges include:
 Mahatma Gandhi Govt. High School
 Sri Sarweshwari Manglam Vidya Mandir (Sewa Ashram School)
 Mediniroy Shiksha Niketan
 Saraswati Shishu Mandir
 Rajkiya Buniyadi Vidyalaya
 Bright Future Public School

References

Villages in Palamu district